The women's snowboard halfpipe competition of the FIS Freestyle Ski and Snowboarding World Championships 2015 was held at Kreischberg, Austria on January 16 (qualifying)  and January 17 (finals). 
23 athletes from 13 countries competed.

Qualification
The following are the results of the qualification.

Final
The following are the results of the finals.

References

Snowboard halfpipe, women's